Mark A. Novotny is an American physicist currently a W. L. Giles Distinguished Professor at Mississippi State University, and an Elected Fellow of the American Association for the Advancement of Science and also American Physical Society for "original algorithm development and applications of computational statistical mechanics to equilibrium and non-equilibrium problems in condensed-matter physics and materials science".

References

Year of birth missing (living people)
Living people
Fellows of the American Association for the Advancement of Science
Fellows of the American Physical Society
21st-century American physicists
Mississippi State University faculty
North Dakota State University alumni
Stanford University alumni